The 197th Infantry Division (197. Infanterie-Division) was a formation of the Imperial German Army in World War I.

References
 197. Infanterie-Division (Chronik 1915/1918) - Der erste Weltkrieg
 Franz Bettag, Die Eroberung von Nowo Georgiewsk. Schlachten des Weltkrieges, Bd. 8 (Oldenburg, 1926)
 Hermann Cron et al., Ruhmeshalle unserer alten Armee (Berlin, 1935)
 Hermann Cron, Geschichte des deutschen Heeres im Weltkriege 1914-1918 (Berlin, 1937)
 Erich von Falkenhayn, Der Feldzug der 9. Armee gegen die Rumänen und Russen, 1916/17 (Berlin, 1921)
 Oberstleutnant a. D. Dr. Curt Treitschke, Der Rückmarsch aus Rumänien. Mit der Mackensen-Armee vom Sereth durch Siebenbürgen nach Sachsen (Dresden 1938)
 Günter Wegner, Stellenbesetzung der deutschen Heere 1825-1939. (Biblio Verlag, Osnabrück, 1993), Bd. 1
 Histories of Two Hundred and Fifty-One Divisions of the German Army which Participated in the War (1914-1918), compiled from records of Intelligence section of the General Staff, American Expeditionary Forces, at General Headquarters, Chaumont, France 1919 (1920)

Infantry divisions of Germany in World War I